The 1999 season was the inaugural season for the Mountain West Conference, created by 8 teams from the Western Athletic Conference splitting off. The Utes were conference co-champions this season, sharing the title with BYU and Colorado State.

Schedule

Roster

After the season

NFL draft
Three players went in the 2000 NFL Draft.

References

Utah
Utah Utes football seasons
Mountain West Conference football champion seasons
Las Vegas Bowl champion seasons
Utah Utes football